Woman is the ninth Korean-language studio album (nineteenth overall) by South Korean singer-songwriter BoA. It was released on October 24, 2018, by SM Entertainment, with distribution by iRiver. The album features ten tracks in total, including the lead single, which shares the same name as the title of the album. The album is BoA's first Korean full-length release since Kiss My Lips (2015).

Background and release 
On October 16, 2018, it was reported that BoA would be making a comeback on October 24. On the same day, SM Entertainment started post a series of teasers for the album on their official SNS accounts.

On October 23, the album's track list was revealed through a "highlight medley", with 6 out of 10 songs written by BoA. The album was released on October 24, 2018, through several music portals, including Melon and iTunes. Analyzing the title track's thematic concept, an editor from Rolling Stone India wrote:

Reception

The accompanying choreography for the title track went viral following the record's release for the "upside-down walk" that was utilized in the introduction. Woman additionally received a nomination for Best Pop Album at the 16th Korean Music Awards in 2019.

Track listing

Charts

References 

2018 albums
BoA albums
SM Entertainment albums
IRiver albums